Roland Jones (November 18, 1813 – February 5, 1869) was an American politician who represented Louisiana in the United States House of Representatives from 1853–1855.

Jones was born in Salisbury, North Carolina where he attended private schools. Later, he taught school in Wilkesboro, North Carolina from 1830–1835. He graduated from Cambridge Law School in 1838 and was admitted to the bar and commenced practice in Brandon, Mississippi. He was also editor of the Brandon Republican from 1838–1840 before he moved to Shreveport, Louisiana in 1840 and resumed the practice of law.

Jones was a member of the Louisiana House of Representatives from 1844–1848 and a district judge of Caddo Parish in 1851 and 1852. He was elected as a Democrat to the Thirty-third Congress (March 4, 1853 – March 3, 1855) but was not a candidate for renomination in 1854. After leaving Congress, he resumed the practice of law. He was again elected district judge in 1860 and served until 1868. He died in Shreveport, Louisiana and was buried in Oakland Cemetery.

External links

1813 births
1869 deaths
People from Salisbury, North Carolina
Politicians from Shreveport, Louisiana
Democratic Party members of the Louisiana House of Representatives
Louisiana state court judges
Democratic Party members of the United States House of Representatives from Louisiana
19th-century American politicians
19th-century American judges